Carrie Kemper (born March 16, 1984) is an American television writer who worked as a staff writer on the NBC sitcom The Office. She is the sister of actress Ellie Kemper.

Career 
Kemper worked as a staff writer on The Office from the beginning of the show's seventh season. She wrote the episodes "Ultimatum" (season 7, episode 13); "Spooked" (season 8, episode 5); "The Whale", in which she appeared as Jan Levinson's assistant Molly (season 9, episode 7); and "Junior Salesman" (season 9, episode 13). In 2010, Kemper and 21 other writers shared a Writers Guild of America award nomination for their work on The Office.

In 2013, she had a brief appearance in the Arrested Development episode "Smashed" as Mrs. Astronaut Lovel.

In 2014, she joined Silicon Valley as a writer and producer. In 2019, she won a Writers Guild of America Award for her work on Nathan for You.

In 2022 she worked as a writer on The Rehearsal.

References

External links 

American television writers
Living people
Place of birth missing (living people)
American women television writers
Carrie
21st-century American screenwriters
21st-century American women writers
American people of Breton descent
American people of English descent
American people of German descent
American people of Italian descent
1980 births
Writers from Kansas City, Missouri
Screenwriters from Missouri